Luis Scott-Vargas (born February 17, 1983), commonly known as LSV, is a professional Magic: the Gathering player from Oakland, California, USA, currently living in Denver, Colorado. His accomplishments include fifteen Grand Prix Top 8s (five wins among them) and ten Pro Tour Top 8s (one win among them). In 2013 he was inducted into the Magic: The Gathering Hall of Fame. As well as being a prominent player of the game, LSV is also known for writing about the game. He was a writer for StarCityGames.com before becoming the editor and vice president for ChannelFireball.com, a Magic: The Gathering shop and strategy website. LSV still writes for ChannelFireball but ended his tenure as editor in 2012 to work as a game designer at Dire Wolf Digital, specifically on Eternal, and in 2021 LSV joined Good Luck Games to work on Storybook Brawl.

Magic: The Gathering career
LSV first qualified for the Pro Tour in 2004 for Pro Tour San Diego and has been an active competitor in major Magic: the Gathering events since.

LSV's breakout performance came at the 2006 US Nationals, where he won a play-off to take third place and earn a place on the US Nationals team with Paul Cheon and Benjamin Lundquist. The US Nationals team would finish 13th in the team competition at the 2006 World Championship.

He went on to win US Nationals in 2007, leading a US Nationals team featuring Thomas Drake and Michael Bennett. The US National team finished in 25th place at the 2007 World Championship. He also won Grand Prix San Francisco that season, his first Grand Prix title.

The 2008 season would bring even greater success for LSV. He made the Top 8 of Grand Prix Philadelphia before going on to make his first Pro Tour Top 8 at Pro Tour Berlin. LSV reached the finals of the Pro Tour where he defeated Matej Zatlkaj to win his first, and so far only, Pro Tour title. He would then continue his success by winning his second Grand Prix event at Grand Prix Atlanta. By the end of the year, LSV had amassed 58 Pro points, placing him in joint second place in the Player of the Year standings alongside Olivier Ruel.

The 2009 season featured another strong set of results for LSV. He started the season by winning his third Grand Prix in as many years at Grand Prix Los Angeles. He then made his second career Pro Tour Top 8 at Pro Tour Kyoto. Once again, he reached the finals, but this time lost to Gabriel Nassif. He would round out his year with another Grand Prix Top 8 at Grand Prix Seattle. He finished in seventh place for the 2009 Player of the Year standings with 52 Pro Points.

The 2010 season would be the first time since 2006 that LSV would not win a major event. However, despite not winning any events, LSV did manage to make a Grand Prix and a Pro Tour Top 8 at Grand Prix Sydney and Pro Tour San Diego. LSV currently holds the record for the longest undefeated run at a Pro Tour after going 16-0 at Pro Tour San Diego, before losing in the semifinals to eventual winner Simon Görtzen. For the second consecutive year, LSV placed seventh in the Player of the Year standings at the end of the season.

The 2011 season was a very successful one for LSV. He won Grand Prix Kansas City and advanced to the Top 8 of US Nationals, Pro Tour Nagoya and the 2011 World Championship. This was the first time that LSV made the Top 8 two Pro Tour events in a single season, and the first time he made Top 8 of a World Championship. LSV only needed to win his quarterfinal match against Richard Bland at the World Championship to overtake Owen Turtenwald and win the Player of the Year title. He lost 2-3 to Bland, leading to Owen Turtenwald winning the Player of the Year title and LSV taking second place. Also in 2011, LSV was invited to take part in the third annual Magic Online Community Cup. The Community Cup is a special event held by Wizards of the Coast in which prominent members of the Magic Online community are invited to the Wizards of the Coast offices to play in a tournament against staff. LSV was picked for the Community Cup for his contribution to the community through draft videos and his articles and work for ChannelFireball.com. Ultimately, it was the Community Team that won the tournament defeating the Wizards Team and winning the Community Cup as well as a prize for the Magic Online community.

From 2009–11, LSV was one of the most consistent players on the Pro Tour, with the highest median and average finish at Pro Tour events amongst high-ranked players.

In the 2012 season, LSV made the Top 8 of Grand Prix Lincoln. His overall performance for the season also qualified him for the inaugural Magic Players Championship. LSV won a 2012 World Magic Cup Qualifier to earn a place on the United States national team, alongside national champion Brian Kibler, for the first World Magic Cup event.

LSV first became eligible for the Magic Pro Tour Hall of Fame in 2013. LSV lead the 2013 ballot, receiving 95.63% of the vote, and thus was the first inductee in the Class of 2013. LSV was inducted into the Hall of Fame at Pro Tour Theros alongside Ben Stark and William Jensen.

After his 2011 Worlds top 8 finish LSV experienced a drought of high-caliber Pro Tour finishes although he made it to the top 8 of several Grand Prix in that period. Eventually LSV managed another Top 8 at Pro Tour Oath of the Gatewatch in 2016 alongside two of his ChannelFireball teammates. In what was LSV's sixth Pro Tour Top 8 he lost to eventual champion Jiachen Tao in the semi-finals, ultimately finishing in third place. LSV followed this up with a top 8 at the next Pro Tour for Shadows Over Innistrad, piloting a BG Aristocrats deck for the standard portion of the event. He lost his quarter final match 3-1 to Shouta Yasooka. The next Pro Tour, for Eldritch Moon, led to LSV's third Pro Tour top 8 in a row, a feat accomplished only twice before (by Scott Johns and Jon Finkel) and not for nearly 18 years.

Despite LSV's great success in the 2015-16 season, he decided to move to primarily doing coverage for the following season instead of playing. However, Wizards of the Coast has allowed him to defer the platinum status he had earned, and he has stated he intends to play on the Pro Tour again at some point in the future.

Play style
LSV is known to favor control decks in Limited, and often comments on his love for drawn out games involving mana-intensive cards. In Constructed, Scott-Vargas has a preference for Combo and Control decks, but has been successful with a variety of different archetypes. When he won Pro Tour Berlin, he piloted an Elf tribal combo deck; he achieved his two Constructed Grand Prix wins with a blue-black control deck and a Storm combo deck; and his three most recent Pro Tour top eight finishes were all with aggressive decks, including a Naya (red-green-white) deck with which he went undefeated in the Swiss rounds of Pro Tour San Diego 2010, and an Eldrazi aggro deck in 2016.

Achievements

Team ChannelFireball
Team ChannelFireball is a team of professional Magic: The Gathering players, formed in 2010. The team is named after two Magic: the Gathering cards – Channel and Fireball, one of the most famous two-card combos from the early days of the game.  Many of the members of the team write strategy articles for an eponymous website. LSV is considered to be the official leader of the team, as he is often responsible for organising the team meeting and practicing for events.

Current and former Team Members

  Luis Scott-Vargas
  Paulo Vitor Damo da Rosa
  David Ochoa
  Josh Utter-Leyton
  Owen Turtenwald
  Conley Woods
  Ben Stark
  Brian Kibler
  Brad Nelson
  Matt Nass
  Tom Martell
  Eric Froehlich
  Shuhei Nakamura
  Martin Juza

  Lukas Blohon
  Reid Duke
  Gerry Thompson
   Shahar Shenhar
  Frank Karsten
  Kenji Tsumura
  Pat Cox
  Ben Lundquist
  Brock Parker
  Paul Rietzl
  Paul Cheon
  David Williams
  Ivan Floch
  Mike Sigrist

Pro Tour Achievements
Team ChannelFireball has had considerable success on the Pro Tour, putting at least one player in the Top 8 of every Pro Tour from Pro Tour San Diego 2010 to Pro Tour Dragon's Maze 2013, with the exception of Pro Tour Avacyn Restored. Eight of the sixteen players participating in the inaugural 2012 Magic Players Championship were members of Team ChannelFireball. Three members of Team ChannelFireball have won Player of the Year titles since the creation of the team: Brad Nelson (2010), though he left the team prior to winning the title; Owen Turtenwald (2011); and Josh Utter-Leyton (2013).

Other Magic-related work
From 2006 to 2009, LSV wrote strategy articles for StarCityGames.com and AdventuresOn.com (now BlackBorder.com). In early 2009, he left both to help launch ChannelFireball.com. Among his work for the site, he's been known for his draft videos and set reviews as well as the Magic TV show. Since 2013, LSV has also been doing commentary at Pro Tours, in addition to the occasional Grand Prix. In 2015, LSV joined Marshall Sutcliffe as a cohost of the Limited Resources podcast, a popular podcast that focuses on the Sealed and Draft aspects of Magic.

Personal life
LSV was born in Oakland, California to his parents Claudio and Penny. He has two brothers, Antonio and Miguel. He graduated from UC Davis in 2005.

In May 2012, LSV announced that he would be moving to Denver, having acquired a job as a game designer there.

On June 29, 2016, LSV and his then wife Geneva Sarcedo's first child was born. They named her Naya Scott Vargas Sarcedo, after the Magic nickname for the color combination of red, green, and white.

On October 11, 2021, Gaby Spartz gave birth to LSV's son and second child, Santi.

References

American Magic: The Gathering players
American people of Chilean descent
Living people
1983 births
People from Oakland, California
University of California, Davis alumni